Gadakh Tukaram Gangadhar (1 November 1953 – 2 December 2022) was an Indian politician who was a member of the 14th Lok Sabha from 2004 to 2009. He represented the Ahmednagar constituency of Maharashtra and was a member of the Nationalist Congress Party (NCP) political party.

Gadakh died from heart failure on 2 December 2022, at the age of 69.

References

1953 births
2022 deaths
People from Maharashtra
India MPs 2004–2009
Marathi politicians
Nationalist Congress Party politicians from Maharashtra
People from Ahmednagar
Lok Sabha members from Maharashtra